The 1979 Mississippi State Bulldogs football team represented Mississippi State University during the 1979 NCAA Division I-A football season. This was the first season at Mississippi State for head coach Emory Bellard, the creator of the wishbone offense.

Schedule

Roster

References

Mississippi State
Mississippi State Bulldogs football seasons
Mississippi State Bulldogs football